Shishir Kumar Bhaduri or Sisir Kumar Bhaduri (2 October 1889 – 30 June 1959) was an Indian stage actor and theatre founder, who commonly referred to as the pioneer of modern Bengali theatre, where he was an actor, director, playwright and even scenic designer. He was survived by one son named, Asoke Kumar Bhaduri. Dhruba Kumar Bhaduri and Shubha Kumar Bhaduri were two of his grandsons.

After Girish Chandra Ghosh, he introduced realism and naturalism to theatre. He was awarded the Padma Bhushan, India's third highest civilian honour by the Government of India in 1959. He refused to take Padma award, saying that if he takes the award, it will send wrong signal that government have helped promoting theatre culture in the country.

Born in Mednipore, West Bengal, he studied at Scottish Church College Kolkata, where he started participating in theatre. He was also a professor of Metropolitan College (today's Vidyasagar College). In 1921, he left his job to become full-time stage actor.

The 2013 play Nihsanga Samrat  directed by Debesh Chattopadhyay, is based on 2005 Bengali novel by the same name written by Sunil Gangopadhyay on the life of Bhaduri.

Filmography

Director
Chanakya (1939)
Talkie of Talkies (1937)... a.k.a. Dasturmoto Talkie
Seeta (1933)
Palli Samaj (1932)
Bicharak (1929)... a.k.a. The Judge
Andhare Alo (1922)... a.k.a. The Influence of Love
Barer Bazar (1922)... a.k.a. Marriage Market (India: English title)
Kamale Kamini (1922)... a.k.a. Maid of the Lotus
Mohini (1921)... a.k.a. Ekadashi... a.k.a. Triumph of Fate

Actor

Chanakya (1939) .... Chanakya
Talkie of Talkies (1937) (as Sisir Bhaduri) .... Prof. Digambar Majumdar... a.k.a. Dasturmoto Talkie
Seeta (1933) .... Ram
Palli Samaj (1932) .... Ramesh
Bicharak (1929)... a.k.a. The Judge
Andhare Alo (1922) .... Satyendra... a.k.a. The Influence of Love
Kamale Kamini (1922)... a.k.a. Maid of the Lotus
Mohini (1921)... a.k.a. Ekadashi... a.k.a. Triumph of Fate

Bibliography
 The Lonely Monarch, by Sunil Gangopadhyay. tr. by Swapna Dutta, Hachette UK, 2013. .

References

External links

1889 births
1959 deaths
Film directors from West Bengal
People from Howrah
Male actors in Bengali cinema
Indian male stage actors
Scottish Church College alumni
University of Calcutta alumni
Academic staff of the University of Calcutta
Recipients of the Padma Bhushan in arts
Bengali theatre personalities
Indian theatre directors
Academic staff of Presidency University, Kolkata
20th-century Indian film directors